Ampang Jaya Municipal Council (Jawi: مجليس ڤربندرن امڤاڠ جاي) is the local authority which administers Ampang Jaya of Selangor, Malaysia. It was founded on 1 July 1992, by combining the sub-districts (Mukim) of Ulu Klang and Ampang from the Gombak District Council (Majlis Daerah Gombak) (which is now known as Selayang Municipal Council) and Hulu Langat District Council (Majlis Daerah Hulu Langat) (now under Kajang Municipal Council) respectively.

Current appointed councillors

2021/2022 Session

Responsibilities
As with most other local government bodies in Malaysia, Ampang Jaya Municipal Council is responsible for public health and sanitation, waste removal and management, city planning, environmental protection and building control, social and economic development and general maintenance of urban infrastructure.

Headquarters
MPAJ's headquarters is located in Pandan Indah.

Organisation chart 
President: Mohd Fauzi Mohd Yatim

Secretary: Johari Atil

Departments 
 Jabatan Perundangan (Law Department)
 Jabatan Perancangan Korporat (Corporate Planning Department)
 Jabatan Pengurusan (Management Department)
 Jabatan Belia dan Kemasyarakatan (Youth and Community Department)
 Jabatan Kejuruteraan (Engineering Department)
 Jabatan Pengurusan Penilaian Harta (Valuing and Property Management Department)
 Jabatan Perkhidmatan Bandar dan Kesihatan (Urban Services and Health Department)
 Jabatan Perlesenan
 Jabatan Bangunan Dan Seni Bina
 Jabatan Pengkuatkuasa

Branch office 
 Pandan Indah (for Hulu Langat District)
 Taman Melawati (for parts of Gombak District)

Administration Area 

MPAJ's town area covers Ampang town, and the adjacent town of Ulu Klang and Pandan Indah, as well as parts of Cheras.

References

External links 
 MPAJ official web site 

Local government in Selangor
Municipal councils in Malaysia